The lateral surface of the greater wing of the sphenoid is convex, and divided by a transverse ridge, the infratemporal crest, into two portions.

The superior or temporal portion, convex from above downward, concave from before backward, forms a part of the temporal fossa, and gives attachment to the Temporalis; the inferior or infratemporal, smaller in size and concave, enters into the formation of the infratemporal fossa, and, together with the infratemporal crest, affords attachment to the Pterygoideus externus.

Additional images

References

External links
 

Bones of the head and neck